The 1998 Pontins Professional was the twenty-fifth edition of the professional invitational snooker tournament which took place in May 1998 in Prestatyn, Wales.

The tournament featured eight professional players. The quarter-final matches were contested over the best of 9 frames, the semi-finals best of eleven and the final best of seventeen.

Mark Williams won the event, beating Martin Clark 9–6 in the final.

Main draw

Final

Century breaks

111  Martin Clark
100  Mark Williams

References

Pontins Professional
Snooker competitions in Wales
Pontins Professional
Pontins Professional
Pontins Professional